Jefitchia is an extinct genus of prehistoric drum.  Species lived from 48.6–33.9 mya (Middle Eocene – Late Oligocene).
Jefitchia have been uncovered in Texas, Louisiana, and Portugal.

External links
Mangrove-dwelling vertebrates from Deep Time: an example of a diverse, middle Eocene community from Laredo, Texas, USA

Sciaenidae
Prehistoric ray-finned fish genera
Eocene fish
Fossils of Portugal